Aachen Prison is a penal facility located in the Soers in Aachen, North Rhine-Westphalia, Germany. As of 2007, 800 criminals are serving their sentences in the prison. Brigitte Kerzl serves as the director of the prison.

On 26 November 2009 two dangerous prisoners escaped from the prison but were later caught.

References

External links 
 Aachen Prison's website 

Prisons in Germany
Buildings and structures in Aachen